Ladakh Police is the police agency responsible for law enforcement and investigations within the Union territory of Ladakh, India. It came into existence on 31 October 2019.

History

The union territory of Ladakh was formed on 31 October as a result of provisions contained within the Jammu and Kashmir Reorganisation Act, 2019. The region was previously part of the state of Jammu and Kashmir and policing was the responsibility of the Jammu and Kashmir Police. A new organisation for the police force of Ladakh was created as part of the reorganisation.

Organizational structure
Ladakh Police is under the direct control of Department of Home Affairs, Government of India. It is headed by an Additional Director General of Police (IGP).

References

Government of Ladakh
Ladakh
Ladakh
2019 establishments in Ladakh